Frederick William  Zercho (16 August 1867 – 15 April 1953) was an Australian school administrator, technical/TAFE college head and technical/TAFE college teacher. The brother of Charles Henry Zercho, he was born in Barkers Creek (near Castlemaine), Victoria and died in Kew, Melbourne, Victoria.

References

Australian educators
Australian Anglicans
Australian people of German descent
Australian people of Scottish descent
1867 births
1953 deaths